The 2010 Pacific Life Pacific-10 Conference men's basketball tournament was played with the first round on March 10, 2010 at Staples Center in Los Angeles, California, with quarterfinals on March 11, semifinals on March 12, and the finals on March 13 (3:00 p.m. PT). Washington, the tournament champion, became the NCAA tournament automatic qualifier from the conference.

Seeds

All Pacific-10 schools except USC played in the tournament. USC was banned from post season play as a result of self-imposed sanctions for illegal benefits received during the 2007–2008 season. Teams were seeded by conference record, with a tiebreaker system used to seed teams with identical conference records.

2010 Pac-10 tournament

Schedule
 Wed., Mar. 10: Oregon vs. Washington State, 8 p.m. FSN;
 Thur., Mar. 11: Arizona vs. UCLA, 12 noon FSN; Oregon vs. California, 2:30 p.m. FSN; Stanford vs. Arizona State, 6 p.m. FSN; Washington vs. Oregon State, 8:30 p.m. FSN
 Fri., Mar. 12: Semifinal 1, 6 p.m. FSN; Semifinal 2, 8:30 p.m. FSN
 Sat., Mar. 13 Championship Game, 3:15 p.m. CBS (Pacific time)

Tournament notes
Officials: Dick Cartmell, Scott Thornley, Michael Reed
The championship game attendance (15,851) declined for the second consecutive year and dropped by over 1,000 from 2009.
Cal earned its first regular season conference title in a half century and was the top seed in the conference tournament for the first time.
Jerome Randle became Cal's leading scorer during the tournament when Cal defeated UCLA 85–72 in the semifinals, surpassing Sean Lampley with 1,790 career points and was perfect at the free-throw line (16–16), a new record. The old mark was made by Sean Elliott of Arizona, who was 96.3% (26–27) in 1989.
 The Golden Bears shot 87.0% free throws (20–23) at the championship game and set the Pac-10 tournament team record of 85.2% (52–61) for the three games, breaking Arizona's 1989 mark of 82.6% (57–69).

 This was the second meeting between Cal and Washington in the Pac-10 tournament, Cal won 84–81 in the play-in round in 2008.
 Cal and Washington both were invited to participate in the NCAA Tournament, with Cal getting an at-large bid.
 Arizona State was invited to the National Invitation Tournament (NIT)
 Oregon State was invited to the College Basketball Invitational (CBI)

All-Tournament Team
 Jamal Boykin, F, California
 Quincy Pondexter, F, Washington
 Jerome Randle, G, California
 Theo Robertson, F, California
 Michael Roll, G, UCLA

Most Outstanding Player
 Isaiah Thomas, G, Washington

2010 Hall of Honor inductees

Pac-10 men’s basketball Pac-10 Hall of Honor luncheon was held on Saturday, March 13, 2010 to honor an individual from each of the Pac-10 member schools.
Mike Bibby (Arizona)
Jeremy Veal (Arizona State)
Earl Robinson (California)
Kenya Wilkins (Oregon)
Dave Gambee (Oregon State)
Reggie Miller (UCLA)
John Arrillaga (Stanford)
John Block (USC)
Eldridge Recasner (Washington)
Paul Lindemann (Washington State)

See also
2008–09 Pacific-10 Conference men's basketball standings

References

External links
 Pac-10 Basketball Tournament site

Pac-12 Conference men's basketball tournament
-2010 Pacific-10 Conference Menand#39;s Basketball Tournament